The Trench may refer to:
 The Trench (Dix), a 1923 painting by Otto Dix that was confiscated by the Nazis and later lost
 The Trench (novel), a 1999 novel by Steve Alten
 The Trench (film), a 1999 film
 The Trench (comics), a fictional comic team
 The Trench, a 1991 novel by Abdul Rahman Munif